Verity Harding (born 1986) is the Co-Lead of Ethics and Society at DeepMind.

Education and early career 
Harding studied history at Pembroke College, Oxford. She specialised in American history and completed a thesis on Black Power under the thesis of Stephen Tuck. In 2007 she was a Michael von Clemm Fellow at Harvard University. In 2022, she was an affiliated researcher at the Bennett Institute for Public Policy at University of Cambridge.

Career 
Harding served as Special Adviser for Nick Clegg until 2013. She was responsible for home affairs and justice. She was part of the fight for same-sex marriage movement in the UK. She was appointed head of Public Policy at Google. She was concerned that YouTube was too busy to filter terrorist videos. In 2015 she was described by Management Today as being one of the Top Women in UK business.

Harding was working on policy for Google's European business when Google were criticised for improper use of health data. In 2017 Harding was appointed as co-lead for ethics and society at DeepMind. DeepMind ethics and society has six pillars, including privacy transparency, economic impacts, governance, managing risk, morality and how to use AI to address the world's challenges. She has discussed artificial intelligence at Cheltenham Science Festival and the Financial Times Festival.

She was appointed Co-Chair of the Partnership on AI Fair, Transparent, and Accountable AI working group. She also serves on the OECD Artificial Intelligence expert group. She has delivered keynote talks on Artificial Intelligence at Cheltenham Science Festival, FT Weekend and at the G7 Multistakeholder Conference.

Harding serves on the Board of Friends of the Royal Academy of Arts.

Diversity and equality 
Harding is a campaigner for more women in technology. She was named by City A.M. as one of the Power 100 Women. She is a judge for the Playfair Prize and on the advisory board of Women on Boards.

References 

1986 births
Living people
Harvard University alumni
Alumni of the University of Oxford
Women technology writers